"Sad Sweet Dreamer" is a song by Sweet Sensation, which was a number-one single on the UK Singles Chart for one week in October 1974.

The second single from the British soul group, a soaring soul ballad heavily influenced by the Stylistics (and led by lead vocalist Marcel King's falsetto), "Sad Sweet Dreamer" became their first hit. It was written by David Parton and co-produced by Tony Hatch and Parton. The song reached No. 14 on the U.S. Billboard Hot 100 the following spring. It charted similarly in Canada. Both Hatch and Jackie Trent sang on the track to augment Sweet Sensation. Hatch wanted to work with them after they were discovered on New Faces whilst he was on the judging panel. The song was covered by French singer Joe Dassin as "Carolina (Sad Sweet Dreamer)" in 1975.

The song can be heard in the 2009 UK television series Red Riding. It is also featured in the 2013 film Rush.

Chart history

Weekly charts

Year-end charts

References

1974 singles
1974 songs
1975 singles
Pye Records singles
Song recordings produced by Tony Hatch
Sweet Sensation (band) songs
UK Singles Chart number-one singles